Smithville is an unincorporated community in Clear Creek Township, Monroe County, in the U.S. state of Indiana.

History
Smithville was laid out in 1851 when the New Albany Railroad was extended to that point. The community was named for George Smith, one of the founders. A post office has been in operation at Smithville since 1854.

Geography

References

Unincorporated communities in Monroe County, Indiana
Unincorporated communities in Indiana
Bloomington metropolitan area, Indiana